The Republican Party of Angola - Conservative Party  is an  anti-corruption political party in Angola that strongly opposes the Popular Movement for the Liberation of Angola (MPLA), which has ruled the country since 1975.

Formation
The party was founded in 1994 in Massachusetts, United States of America. Its permanent headquarters in Luanda, Angola.

Presidential Election
After the 2008 parliamentary elections, the first time in 17 years that Angola went to the polls, the MPLA-government proposed that presidential elections be held in September 2009. Earlier that year the MPLA's leader, José Eduardo dos Santos, declared that the approval of a new constitution was the highest priority for his party.

In his New Year's address, Dos Santos also stated that his party will propose, through its parliamentary members, the creation of an "ad hoc" committee in the National Assembly, which would be in charge of preparing the new draft constitution  and "promoting, whenever appropriate, a broad discussion [of the draft] before approval by the Parliament". Dos Santos did not mention the future presidential election, and, in so doing, fueled rumors that the Angolans will not return to the polls in 2009, as they had expected. There has been a range of speculation on Angolan blogs and media about the reasons behind this.

Carlos Alberto Contreiras Gouveia, the Republic Part of Angola's president, said that the MPLA are facilitating the constitutional amendment process to perpetuate Dos Santos' presidential power by an indirect-electoral process that violates the constitution. 
In August 2009, the former US Secretary of State, Hillary Clinton, urged Angola to hold credible elections - "we look forward to Angola building on this positive step by including adopting of a new constitution, investigating and prosecuting past human rights abuses and holding timely, free and fair elections,".

See also
History of Angola
Cuba in Angola
African independence movements
List of current Angolan ministers

External links
Official website
Flag of the party

20th century in Angola
Political parties in Angola
Anti-corruption parties